Independence Township is a township in Doniphan County, Kansas, United States.  As of the 2000 census, its population was 342.

Geography

The streams of Jordan Creek and North Branch Independence Creek run through this township.

References
 USGS Geographic Names Information System (GNIS)

External links
 City-Data.com

Townships in Doniphan County, Kansas
Townships in Kansas